Open access to scholarly communication in Austria has developed in the 2010s largely through government initiatives. The Austrian Science Fund and  launched the "Open Access Netzwerk Austria" in 2012 to coordinate country-wide efforts. The "E-Infrastructures Austria" project began in 2014 to develop repositories. The international advocacy effort "OpenscienceASAP – Open Science as a Practice" is based in Austria.

Repositories 
There are a number of collections of scholarship in Austria housed in digital open access repositories. They contain journal articles, book chapters, data, and other research outputs that are free to read.

Timeline

Key events in the development of open access in Austria include the following:
 2007
 June: International Conference on Electronic Publishing held in Vienna.
 2012
 Open Access Netzwerk Austria established.
 2014
 E-Infrastructures Austria begins.

See also

 Internet in Austria
 Education in Austria
 Media of Austria
 List of libraries in Austria
 Open access in other countries

References

Further reading

External links
 
 
 
 
 

Academia in Austria
Communications in Austria
Austria
Science and technology in Austria